Seroiata was a town of ancient Lycia, between Patara and Phellus. The name is not attested in history, but is derived from epigraphic and other evidence. 

Its site is located near the modern town of Seyret, Asiatic Turkey.

References

Populated places in ancient Lycia
Former populated places in Turkey
Kaş District